Kalavida is an Indian Kannada-language thriller film directed by Shivananda H D and starring Pradeep Kumar and Sambrama in the lead roles. It was released in 2021. Kumar, who is making his debut, has produced the film under his home banner Padmraj Films.

Cast

Pradeep Kumar as Caricaturist Kantesh
Sambrama as Nitya
Jagadish as Chandra
Lokesh as Surya
Manjunath Hegde
Aruna Balraj
Moogu Suresh
Late. Shri Vatara Mallesh
Geetha Bharathi

Soundtrack

References

Upcoming Kannada-language films
Upcoming films